Thorvald Andersen may refer to:
Thorvald Andersen, a Danish architect (1883–1935)
Carl Thorvald Andersen, a Danish architect (1835–1916)

See also 
List of Danish architects